Blue Champagne is a  1986 collection of science fiction stories by American writer John Varley. It was published as a hardcover in January 1986, followed by a paperback edition in November.

Contents
The collection includes eight stories, four of which take place in Varley's Eight Worlds future history.
 "The Pusher", originally published in The Magazine of Fantasy & Science Fiction, 1981
 "Blue Champagne", originally published in New Voices 4, 1981
 "Tango Charlie and Foxtrot Romeo", first published in this collection
 "Options", originally published in Universe 9, 1979
 "Lollipop and the Tar Baby", originally published in Orbit 19, 1977, previously appeared in Varley's 1980 collection The Barbie Murders
 "The Manhattan Phone Book (Abridged)", originally published at Westercon 37, 1984
 "The Unprocessed Word", first published in this collection
 "Press Enter■", originally published in Isaac Asimov's Science Fiction Magazine, 1984

Awards
Blue Champagne won the 1987 Locus Award for Best Collection.

References

External links

Eight Worlds series
1980 short story collections